Jacob Utsch (8 September 1824, Erndtebrück – 3 August 1901, Freudenberg) was a German physician and botanist, who specialized in the plant genus Rubus.

He studied medicine at the Universities of Bonn, Marburg, Halle and Berlin, obtaining his doctorate at the latter institution in 1849. From 1852 he practiced medicine in Freudenberg, where he later attained the title of Sanitätsrat. As a botanist he collected specimens mainly in the vicinity of Freudenberg.

In 1896 he published a work on Rubus hybrids titled  Hybriden im Genus Rubus. He is also known for his treatment of the genus Rubus in Konrad Beckhaus's comprehensive Flora von Westfalen ("Flora of Westphalia", 1893).

References 

1824 births
1901 deaths
People from Siegen-Wittgenstein
University of Bonn alumni
University of Marburg alumni
University of Halle alumni
Humboldt University of Berlin alumni
19th-century German botanists